Blastobasis iuanae is a moth in the  family Blastobasidae. It is found in Costa Rica.

The length of the forewings is 5.2–7.2 mm. The forewings have pale greyish-brown scales intermixed with greyish-brown scales tipped with pale greyish brown and greyish brown scales. The hindwings are translucent pale brown.

Etymology
The specific epithet is derived from Latin  (meaning door).

References

Moths described in 2013
Blastobasis